"Changes" (stylized in lowercase) is a song written and performed by American rapper and singer XXXTentacion from his second studio album ?. The song features uncredited vocals from fellow American rapper and singer PnB Rock. It was released as the second single from the album on March 2, 2018. It is XXXTentacion's last single to be released during his lifetime.

Release and reception
On March 1, 2018, X announced he was releasing two songs from his then-upcoming album ?, saying on Instagram "Dropping two songs from my album tonight at 12:00 am est, play them more times than you can count." "Changes" was released on March 2, 2018, on Spotify, Deezer, iTunes/Apple Music and Tidal alongside "Sad!".

HotNewHipHop called it a "slow jam" and noted that X is "channeling his emotion to go for more of a singing vibe." Billboard called it a "heart-on-sleeve track" with revealing lyrics. XXL called the song a "piano-driven ballad" that takes a different tone than X's "Sad!".

Credits and personnel
Credits adapted from Tidal.
 Jahseh Onfroy – vocals, songwriting, composition
 Rakim Allen – vocals, songwriting, composition, director
 Robert Soukiasyan – mixing
 Kevin Peterson – mastering
 Dave Kutch – mastering

Charts

Weekly charts

Year-end charts

Certifications

References

External links

Lyrics from Genius

2018 singles
2018 songs
2010s ballads
XXXTentacion songs
Contemporary R&B ballads
Songs written by XXXTentacion